Pierre Watier or Pierre Wathier (4 September 1770 – 3 February 1846), was a French general of division during the First French Empire under Napoleon. He served in the cavalry during his entire career. After his exploits at Austerlitz he was promoted to general officer. He fought in the War of the Fourth Coalition and the Peninsular War and later led heavy cavalry divisions at Borodino and Waterloo. Born at Laon, Aisne, Watier is one of 660 personalities to have their names inscribed under the Arc de Triomphe in Paris, the city where he died. WATHIER appears on Column 12 on the east side.

Career

Pierre Watier enlists on 3 September 1790 as second lieutenant in the 12th Chasseurs-a-Cheval Regiment, formerly of Champagne, and takes part in the campaigns of 1792–94 in the Army of the North, where he becomes Lieutenant in the 16th Chasseurs-a-Cheval Regiment on 26 May 1793, is promoted to captain on 14 August 1793 and to major on 18 November 1793. He then takes part in the campaigns of 1794–96 in the Inland Army and of 1797–1800 in the Army of Batavia.

He is appointed as colonel of the 4th Dragoons Regiment on 4 October 1799 and takes part with his regiment in the campaigns of 1800–01 in the Gallo-Batavian Army, where he distinguishes himself at Nuremberg on 18 December 1800. Awarded with Knight's cross of the Légion d'honneur on 11 December 1803 and Officer's cross of this Order on 14 June 1804, he takes part with the Grand Army in the campaign of 1805 in Austria, where he distinguishes himself at Donauwerth on 18 October 1805 and at Diernstein, where he is taken as prisoner and exchanged, on next 11 November, and he is promoted to brigadier-general on 24 December 1805.

Appointed as commander of the depot of dragoons in Versailles on 17 June 1806, he is called up to the Grand Army in July to take command of the 2nd Brigade of the 1st Cavalry Corps, becomes Equerry to the Emperor on 23 September, and takes part in the campaign of 1806 in Prussia, where he distinguishes himself at Schleitz on 9 October and at Crewismuhlen on 4 November 4. Given command in December of the 3rd Light Cavalry Brigade of the Cavalry Reserve, he takes part in the campaign of 1807 in Poland, where he is awarded with Commander's cross of the Légion d'honneur on 14 May 1807 and with Knight's cross of the Order of the Lion of Bavaria on 29 June. Elevated to the rank of Count of the Empire, with the title of Saint-Alphonse, on 19 March 1808, he takes command in next July of the 3rd Cavalry Corps of the Army of Spain, with which he distinguishes himself at Burgos, at Fuentes-de-Oñoro and during the siege of Saragossa. Given command of the 2nd Cuirassier Division of the Army of Germany in June, he returns to Spain in October and takes part in the campaigns of 1810 and 1811 in the Armies of the North of Spain and of Portugal, where he is promoted to major-general on 31 July 1811.

Called up then to the Grand Army for the Russian campaign of 1812, he is given command of the 2nd Cuirassiers Division of the 2nd Reserve Cavalry Corps, with which he distinguishes himself at Borodino. He takes then part in the campaign of 1813 in Saxony, where he takes command of the cavalry of the 13th Corps on 3 September 1813 and is trapped in Hamburg during the blockade of that place and returns to France when it surrenders in May 1814.

After the Emperor's abdication, he is placed in non-activity and is awarded with Knight's cross of the Royal and Military Order of Saint-Louis on 19 July 19. He embraces the Emperor's cause during the Hundred-Days, and takes part in the campaign of 1815 in command of the 13th Cavalry Division of the 4th Cavalry Corps of the Army of the North. Replaced in non-activity after the Second Restoration, he is called back in availability on 30 December 1818 and then posted as Inspector-General of Cavalry in 1820 and 1821 and awarded with Grand-Officer's cross of the Légion d'honneur on 1 May 1821. He is appointed as Inspector of Gendarmerie in 1823, as Chairman of the Horse Selection Committee in 1825 and as Chairman of the Cavalry Committee on 1 January 1830. Placed again in availability in April 1830, he is transferred in the Veteran Pool in 1835, in non-activity in 1836 and finally in the reserve pool of the General Staff on 15 August 1839.

References

1770 births
1846 deaths
People from Laon
French generals
French commanders of the Napoleonic Wars
French military personnel of the French Revolutionary Wars
Names inscribed under the Arc de Triomphe